An Yong-hyon is a North Korean politician.  He served as a delegate to the 10th and 11th sessions of the Supreme People's Assembly, held in 1998 and 2003.

See also
 Politics of North Korea
 List of Koreans

References
 Yonhap News Agency.  "Who's who in North Korea," pp. 787–812 in 

Living people
Members of the Supreme People's Assembly
Year of birth missing (living people)